The 1974–75 Lancashire Cup was the sixty-second occasion on which the completion had been held. Widnes won the trophy by beating Salford by the score of 19-9.

Competition and results 
The total number of teams entering the competition remained at last season’s total of 14 with no junior/amateur clubs taking part. The same fixture format was retained, but due to the decrease in the number of participating clubs, resulted in one  “blank” or “dummy” fixtures in the first round, and one bye in the second round.

Round 1 
Involved  7 matches (with one “blank” fixture) and 14 clubs

Round 2 - Quarter-finals 
Involved 3 matches (with one bye) and 7 clubs

Round 2 – replays  
Involved 1 match and 2 clubs

Round 3 – Semi-finals  
Involved 2 matches and 4 clubs

Final 
The match was played at Central Park, Wigan, (historically in the county of Lancashire). The attendance was 7,403 and receipts were £2,833.

Teams and scorers 

Scoring - Try = three points - Goal = two points - Drop goal = one point

The road to success

Notes and comments 
1 * The John Player Yearbook 1975–76  gives the attendance as 7,403, as does Rothmans Yearbook of 1991-92  - The RUGBYLEAGUEproject   gives the attendance as  6,703
2 * Central Park was the home ground of Wigan with a final capacity of 18,000, although the record attendance was  47,747 for Wigan v St Helens 27 March 1959

See also 
1974–75 Northern Rugby Football League season
Rugby league county cups

References

External links
Saints Heritage Society
1896–97 Northern Rugby Football Union season at wigan.rlfans.com 
Hull&Proud Fixtures & Results 1896/1897
Widnes Vikings - One team, one passion Season In Review - 1896-97
The Northern Union at warringtonwolves.org

RFL Lancashire Cup
Lancashire Cup